In mathematics, a derivation  of a commutative ring  is called a locally nilpotent derivation (LND) if every element of  is annihilated by some power of . 

One motivation for the study of locally nilpotent derivations comes from the fact that some of the counterexamples to Hilbert's 14th problem are obtained as the kernels of a derivation on a polynomial ring.

Over a field  of characteristic zero, to give a locally nilpotent derivation on the integral domain , finitely generated over the field, is equivalent to giving an action of the additive group  to the affine variety . Roughly speaking, an affine variety admitting "plenty" of actions of the additive group is considered similar to an affine space.

Definition 
Let  be a ring. If  is an algebra over a field , we additionally require  to be -linear, so .

A derivation  is called a locally nilpotent derivation (LND) if for every , there exists a positive integer   such that .

If  is graded, we say that a locally nilpotent derivation  is homogeneous (of degree ) if  for every .

, but ). However, if  then  implies  and if ,  then .

Relation to -actions 
Let  be an algebra over a field  of characteristic zero (e.g. ).
A -action on  corresponds to an -algebra homomorphism .
Conversely, any locally nilpotent derivation  determines a homomorphism  by 

It is easy to see that the conjugate actions correspond to conjugate derivations, i.e. if  and  then  and

The kernel algorithm 
The algebra  consists of the invariants of the corresponding -action. A special case of Hilbert's 14th problem asks whether  is finitely generated, or, if , whether the quotient  is affine. By Zariski's finiteness theorem, it is true if . For  the answer, in general, is negative. The case  is open.

However, in practice it often happens that  is known to be finitely generated: notably, by the Maurer–Weitzenböck theorem, it is the case for linear LND's of the polynomial algebra over a field of characteristic zero (by linear we mean homogeneous of degree zero with respect to the standard grading).

Assume  is finitely generated. If  is a finitely generated algebra over a field of characteristic zero, then  can be computed using van den Essen's algorithm, as follows. Choose a local slice, i.e. an element  and put . Finding the generators of each  and checking whether  is a standard computation using Gröbner bases.

Slice theorem 
Assume that  admits a slice, i.e.  such that .

For any local slice  we can apply the slice theorem to the localization , and thus obtain that  is locally a polynomial algebra with a standard derivation.

However, in general it is not true that  is locally trivial. For example, let . Then  is a coordinate ring of a singular variety, and the fibers of the quotient map over singular points are two-dimensional.

If  then  is a curve. To describe the -action, it is important to understand the geometry . Assume further that  and that  is smooth and contractible (in which case  is smooth and contractible as well) and choose  to be minimal (with respect to inclusion). However, it is conjectured that  is always contractible.

Examples

Example 1 
The standard coordinate derivations  of a polynomial algebra  are locally nilpotent.

Example 2 (Freudenburg's (2,5)-homogeneous derivation) 
The fixed point set of the corresponding -action equals .

Example 3 
Consider . However, if  then this bundle is trivial in the smooth category

LND's of the polynomial algebra 
Let  be a field of characteristic zero (using Kambayashi's theorem one can reduce most results to the case ) and let  be a polynomial algebra.

(-actions on an affine plane)

(-actions on an affine 3-space)

Triangular derivations 
A derivation is called triangulable if it is conjugate to a triangular one, or, equivalently, if it is triangular with respect to some system of variables. Every triangular derivation is locally nilpotent.

Bass's example

Makar-Limanov invariant 

The intersection of the kernels of all locally nilpotent derivations of the coordinate ring, or, equivalently, the ring of invariants of all -actions, is called "Makar-Limanov invariant" and is an important algebraic invariant of an affine variety.

References

Further reading 
A Nowicki, the fourteenth problem of hilbert for polynomial derivations

Differential algebra